Kavinder Gupta (born 2 December 1959) is an Indian politician from the union territory  of  Jammu and Kashmir. He is the last Deputy Chief Minister of Jammu and Kashmir state.

Personal life
Kavinder Gupta was born on 2 December 1959. He has three children – two daughters and one son.

Political career
Gupta joined the Rashtriya Swayamsevak Sangh at the age of thirteen. He was jailed for thirteen months during The Emergency. Gupta served as the secretary of the Punjab unit of the Vishva Hindu Parishad from 1978 to 1979. He also served as the chief of the Jammu and Kashmir unit of the Bharatiya Yuva Morcha from 1993 till 1998.

Gupta was elected mayor of the city of Jammu for a record three consecutive terms, from 2005 to 2010. In the 2014 Jammu and Kashmir Legislative Assembly election, he contested as a member of Bharatiya Janata Party and was elected a Member of Legislative Assembly from the Gandhinagar constituency. He defeated Raman Bhalla of the Indian National Congress, the incumbent. On 19 March 2015, Gupta was elected speaker of the assembly. He also became the first ever Bharatiya Janata Party leader to be appointed as the speaker.

On 30 April 2018, Gupta was appointed as the Deputy Chief Minister of Jammu and Kashmir state as a part of a cabinet reshuffle. He succeeded Nirmal Kumar Singh.

On 19 June 2018, Gupta resigned from the post of Deputy Chief Minister after 51 days of taking the oath as BJP pulled out from the alliance with PDP. Ram Madhav, then BJP National General Secretary, presided over the press conference in which the announcement to end the alliance was made. He criticised the CM Mehbooba Mufti-led government, saying it had "failed in its responsibility." He added that increase in violence, threat to fundamental rights and increase in radicalisation were the main factors behind the BJP's decision to quit the J&K coalition government.

Controversies
In February 2015, Gupta courted controversy by blaming the Rohingya Muslim refugees for the 2018 Sunjuwan attack on an army camp. After being sworn in as the Deputy Chief Minister of the state, Gupta stated that the Kathua rape case was a "small incident [which] should not be given too much importance". Hindu right-wing groups had held rallies supporting the accused in the case, the gang-rape and murder of an eight-year-old Muslim girl. He faced criticism from opposition Congress party and opposition leader Omar Abdullah. Gupta later said that the media had misinterpreted his comment.

References

Bharatiya Janata Party politicians from Jammu and Kashmir
Speakers of the Jammu and Kashmir Legislative Assembly
Jammu and Kashmir MLAs 2014–2018
Living people
Deputy chief ministers of Jammu and Kashmir
1959 births